Experimental Cell Research is a peer-reviewed scientific journal covering cell biology. It was established in 1950 by Academic Press and is currently published by Elsevier.

External links 
 

Publications established in 1950
Molecular and cellular biology journals
Elsevier academic journals
English-language journals